Hsinchu is a railway station in East District, Hsinchu City, Taiwan served by Taiwan Railways Administration. Hsinchu Station is a major station on the West Coast line and the western terminus of the Neiwan line.

Structure 
There are two island platforms and one side platform, as well as the historic fourth-generation European-style station building which opened in 1913, during Japanese rule.

Service 
Except Tzu-Chiang Limited Express southbound 133, 143, northbound 138, and some Taroko Expresses, all other trains stop at Hsinchu Station. It is also the main destination of commuter local trains in Northern Taiwan. Neiwan line trains travel from this station to Neiwan Station. Connection to the THSR Hsinchu Station is available through Liujia line (which branches off from the Neiwan line's Zhuzhong Station).

Around the station
 Black Bat Squadron Memorial Hall
 Hsinchu City Art Site of Railway Warehouse
 Hsinchu Performing Arts Center
 Immaculate Heart of Mary Cathedral
 National Hsinchu Living Arts Center

Sister stations
Hsinchu Station has "sister station" agreements with Grand Central Terminal in USA since August 2013 and with Tokyo Station in Japan since February 12, 2015.

See also
 List of railway stations in Taiwan

References

External links 

TRA Hsinchu Station 
TRA Hsinchu Station 

Railway stations served by Taiwan Railways Administration
Railway stations in Hsinchu
1893 establishments in Taiwan
National monuments of Taiwan
Neoclassical architecture in Taiwan